Archibald Henry Grimké (August 17, 1849 – February 25, 1930) was an African American lawyer, intellectual, journalist, diplomat and community leader in the 19th and early 20th centuries. He graduated from freedmen's schools, Lincoln University in Pennsylvania, and Harvard Law School and served as American Consul to the Dominican Republic from 1894 to 1898. He was an activist for rights for blacks, working in Boston and Washington, D.C. He was a national vice-president of the National Association for the Advancement of Colored People (NAACP), as well as president of its Washington, D.C. branch.

Early life and education
Grimké was born into slavery on his father's plantation near Charleston, South Carolina, in 1849. He was the eldest of three sons of Henry W. Grimké, a widower, and Nancy Weston, a woman he enslaved who had also been born into slavery as the daughter of an enslaved African or African-American female. Henry acknowledged his sons, although he did not manumit (free) them, or make the rest of his family aware of their existence. Archibald's brothers were Francis and John. Henry was a member of a prominent, large slaveholding family in Charleston. His father and relatives were planters and active in political and social circles.

After becoming a widower, Henry moved with Weston to his plantation outside of Charleston. He was a father to his sons, teaching them and Nancy to read and write. In 1852, as he was dying, Henry willed Nancy, who was pregnant with their third child, and their two sons Archibald and Francis to his legal (white) son and heir Montague Grimké, whose mother was Henry's deceased wife. Henry was prohibited to free them by a South Carolina law, passed in 1841, that did not allow for the release of slaves through gifts or trusts. He directed that they "be treated as members of the family," but Montague never provided well for them. 

Henry's sister Eliza, executor of his will, brought the family to Charleston, but she did not aid them financially. Montague allowed Nancy and her children to live relatively freely for a time, with Nancy working as a laundress to sustain the family. In 1860, after getting married, Montague claimed the boys as house servants. Later he hired out both Archibald and Francis, due to their insubordination. After Francis rebelled, Montague Grimké sold him. Archibald ran away and hid for two years with relatives until after the end of the Civil War.

After the American Civil War ended, the three Grimké boys attended freedmen's schools, where their talents were recognized by the teachers. The school had been opened by Gilbert Pillsbury, the brother of abolitionist Parker Pillsbury. Gilbert and his wife recognized the Archibald and Francis' talents and garnered support to send them to the North. They studied at Lincoln University in Pennsylvania, established for the education of blacks. Their professors had found them extraordinary students, and both Archibald and Francis graduated from Lincoln in 1870. A Lincoln catalog of 1871 lists Archibald as "Instructor of English grammar".

Career 
Archibald Grimké lived and worked in the Hyde Park neighborhood of Boston area most of his career. Beginning in the 1880s, he began to get active in politics and speaking out about the rise of white supremacy following the end of Reconstruction in the South. From 1883 to 1885 he was editor of the Hub, a Republican newspaper that tried to attract black readers. Archibald supported equal rights for blacks, both in the paper and in public lectures, which were popular in the nineteenth century. He became increasingly active in politics, and was chosen for the Republican Party's state convention in 1884. That year he was also appointed to the board of Westborough Insane Hospital, a state hospital. Archibald became involved in the women's rights movement, which his aunts had supported, and addressed it in the Hub. He was elected as president of the Massachusetts Woman Suffrage Association.  Believing that the Republicans were not doing enough, he left the party in 1886. In 1889, he joined the staff of the Boston Herald as a special writer.

In the South, the situation for Blacks was deteriorating, and Archibald continued the struggle against racism, allying at times with other major leaders of the day. He had also become involved in Frederick Douglass' National Council of Colored People, a predecessor to the NAACP, which grappled with issues of education for blacks, especially in the South. Archibald disagreed with Booker T. Washington about emphasizing industrial and agricultural education for freedmen (the South still had a primarily agricultural economy).  He believed there needed to be opportunities for academic and higher education such as he had.

In 1901, with several other men he started The Guardian, a newspaper in which they could express their views.  They selected William Monroe Trotter as editor.  Together Grimké and Trotter also organized the Boston Literary and Historical Association, which at the time was a gathering of men opposed to Booker T. Washington's views. For a time he was allied with W.E.B. Du Bois, but Grimké continued to make his own way between the two groups.

Despite earlier conflict with Washington and his followers, in 1905, Grimké started writing for The New York Age, the leading black paper; it was allied with Washington. Archibald wrote about national issues from his own point of view, for instance, urging more activism and criticizing President Theodore Roosevelt for failing to adequately support black troops in Brownsville, Texas, where they were accused of starting a riot.

Continuing his interest in intellectual work, he served as president of the American Negro Academy from 1903 to 1919, which supported African-American scholars and promoted higher education for blacks. He published several papers with them, dealing with issues of the day, such as his analysis in "Modern Industrialism and the Negroes of the United States" (1908). He believed that capitalism as practiced in the United States could help freedmen who left agriculture to achieve independence and true freedom.

In 1907 he became involved with the Niagara Movement and later with the NAACP, both of which were founded by Du Bois. Men continued to struggle to find the best way to deal with racism and advance equal rights, at a time when lynching of black men in the South continued.

After his daughter graduated from college, Archibald became increasingly active as a leader in the NAACP, which was founded in 1909.  First he was active in Boston, for instance, writing letters in protest of proposed federal legislation. to prohibit interracial marriages. (The legislation was not passed.)   In 1913, he was recruited by national leaders to become the president of the Washington, DC branch and moved to the capital with his daughter Angelina.  As president, Grimké wrote detailed accounts of local racial injustices, such as inequitable distribution of educational funds, taking direct action in his community. His brother Francis and his wife Charlotte still lived there.

Grimké led the public protest in Washington, D.C., against the segregation of federal offices under President Woodrow Wilson, who acceded to wishes of other Southerners on his cabinet.  Grimké testified before Congress against it in 1914 but did not succeed in gaining changes.  About this time, he also became a national vice-president of the NAACP.  The organization supported the U.S. in World War I, but Grimké highlighted the racial discrimination against blacks in the military and worked to change it.

He fell ill in 1928.  At the time, he and Angelina were living with his brother Francis, by then a widower. His daughter and brother cared for him until his death in 1930.

Honors and awards 
1919, the NAACP awarded him the Spingarn Medal for his life work for racial equality.
In 1934, the Phelps Colored Vocational School was renamed Grimke Elementary School in his honor. The school was closed in 1989 and the building served as headquarters for the Washington D.C. Fire and Corrections Departments until 2012, when the main building was left vacant. The gymnasium has housed the African American Civil War Museum since 2010.

Marriage and family

Grimké Sisters 
By the time Henry began his relationship with Weston, his two half-sisters, Sarah and Angelina, had been gone from Charleston for years. Unwilling to live in a slave society, they left the South and their family and became noted abolitionists and feminists, drawing on their first-hand knowledge of slavery's horrors. Together known as the Grimké sisters, they were active as writers and speakers in Northern abolitionist circles, having joined the Quakers and the American Anti-Slavery Society.  After Angelina married Theodore Weld, the three lived and worked for years in New Jersey. They operated a school together. In 1864, they moved to Hyde Park, Massachusetts, a new community outside Boston.

In February 1868 Angelina Grimké Weld read an article in which Edwin Bower, a professor at Lincoln University near Philadelphia, compared Lincoln's all-black student body favorably with "any class I have ever had," with special praise for a student named Grimké, who came to the university "just out of slavery." Stunned, she investigated, and found that Archibald and his siblings were her brother's children. She and Sarah acknowledged the boys and their mother Nancy Weston as family, and tried to provide them with better opportunities. They paid for their nephews' education: Archibald and Francis attended Harvard University and Howard University, respectively, for law. Francis shifted to Princeton Theological Seminary and became a minister. The Grimkés introduced the young men to their abolitionist circles.

Brothers 
Francis J. Grimké did graduate work at Princeton Theological Seminary and became an ordained Presbyterian minister.  He married Charlotte Forten, of the prominent Philadelphia black abolitionist family. She was also an abolitionist and a teacher, and became known for her diaries, written mostly from 1854 to 1864. He headed the 15th Street Presbyterian Church in Washington, DC, for more than 40 years. Francis died in 1939.

The youngest brother, John Grimké, did not stay in school. He moved South and had little to no contact with his family for the rest of his life. He died in 1915 in New York City.

Marriage and children 
After getting established with his law practice in Boston, Massachusetts, Grimké met and married Sarah Stanley, a white woman from the Midwest. In 1880 they had a daughter, Angelina Weld Grimké, named after Archibald's aunt.  They separated while their daughter was young, and Stanley returned with Angelina to the Midwest when the girl was three.  When Angelina was seven, Stanley started working. She brought Angelina back to Archibald in Boston. The couple never reconciled, and Stanley never saw her daughter again; she committed suicide by poisoning in 1898.

In 1894, Grimké was appointed consul to the Dominican Republic. While he held this position, his daughter Angelina lived for years with his brother Francis and his wife Charlotte in Washington, D.C., where Francis was minister of the 15th Street Presbyterian Church.

After graduating from school, Angelina became a teacher and writer. Her essays and poetry were published by The Crisis of the NAACP.  In 1916, she wrote the play Rachel, which addressed lynching, in response to a call by the NAACP for works to protest the controversial film The Birth of a Nation.  It is one of the first plays by an African American considered to be part of the Harlem Renaissance. In addition, she wrote poetry, some of which is now considered the first lesbian work by an African American.

Published writings
 Books
 
 
 Pamphlets and articles (most recent first)

See also

Negro Academy

References

Further reading (most recent first)
 
 
Bruce, Dickson D., Jr. Archibald Grimke: Portrait of a Black Independent, Baton Rouge, La: Louisiana State University Press, 1993.
Starr, William W. "Bio of black activist restores his prestige," The State (Aug. 22, 1993), 4F.

External links
 
 
 

1849 births
1930 deaths
African-American lawyers
American lawyers
African-American journalists
American male journalists
African-American academics
NAACP activists
Archibald
Harvard Law School alumni
Lincoln University (Pennsylvania) alumni
Spingarn Medal winners
Massachusetts Republicans
Washington, D.C., Republicans
African-American diplomats
American diplomats
Academics from Washington, D.C.
Academics from Massachusetts
Academics from South Carolina
People from Hyde Park, Boston
19th-century American slaves
Literate American slaves
20th-century African-American people